Saperda similis is a species of beetle in the family Cerambycidae. It was described by Laicharting in 1784. It has a wide distribution in Europe. It feeds on Salix caprea. It contains the varietas Saperda similis var. albopubescens.

References

scalaris
Beetles described in 1784